Young America is an unincorporated community in Deer Creek Township, Cass County, Indiana.

History
Young America was platted about 1856. The town sprang up around a saw mill. When someone wrote "Young America" on the mill's boiler, to indicate the promise of the enterprise, the name stuck.

The Young America post office was established in 1876 and ceased operations in 2019.

Geography

Climate

According to the Köppen Climate Classification system, Young America has a hot-summer humid continental climate, abbreviated "Dfa" on climate maps.

References

External links

Unincorporated communities in Cass County, Indiana
Unincorporated communities in Indiana
1850s establishments in the United States
Populated places established in the 1850s